Emanuele Greppi (27 November 1853 – 9 January 1931), 6th Count of Bussero and Corneliano was an Italian lawyer, politician and historian. He was mayor of Milan. He served in the Senate of the Kingdom of Italy.

References

1853 births
1931 deaths
19th-century Italian lawyers
19th-century Italian politicians
Members of the Senate of the Kingdom of Italy
Mayors of Milan